Dharmesh Tiwari (27 April 1951 – 6 August 2014) was an Indian actor and film director. He is memorable for portraying Kripacharya in the TV series Mahabharat and Malayraj in Chanakya.

He essayed the role of a judge on the Hindi TV serial Kanoon.

He directed and wrote the script for Mahabharat Aur Barbareek in 2013. This was his last project.

In 2001, he was Honorary General Secretary of Cine and TV Artistes Association.

In 2003, he was president of the Federation of Western India Cine Employees, a film worker's union.

Dharmesh also did the role of Jaswant Singh in as ABP News 26 episodes series of political show Pradhanmantri in 2013.

Tiwari died of diabetes at the age of 63 on 6 August 2014.

References

External links
 
 

1951 births
Film directors from Chandigarh
2014 deaths
Indian male television actors